Fanny Ikhayere Amun  (born 1 October 1962) is a Nigerian former football player and coach. He led the Nigeria national under-17 team to victory at the 1993 FIFA U-17 World Championship.

Career 
Amun was born in Osogbo, Nigeria.

In 1993, Amun coached the Nigeria national under-17 team at the 1993 FIFA U-17 World Championship in Japan, helping the team win the competition. He coached the under-20 team in 1995 at the 1995 African Youth Championship, hosted by Nigeria.

Amun was appointed assistant coach of the Nigeria national team for the 1998 FIFA World Cup in France. He was Secretary-General for the Nigeria Football Federation (NFF).

Amun retired as an Assistant Director in the Federal Ministry of Sports in 2007.

Personal life 
Amun is  a Member of the Order of the Niger. In 2013, Amun was arrested for physically assaulting a man.

Honours

Manager 
Nigeria U17
 FIFA U-17 World Championship: 1993

Nigeria U20
 African Youth Championship third place: 1995

Orders 
 Member of the Order of the Niger

References

Living people
1962 births
People from Osogbo
Nigerian footballers
Nigerian football managers
Association football coaches
Members of the Order of the Niger
Association footballers not categorized by position